Bowen is a Celtic surname representing two separate Celtic ethnicities, the Welsh ab Owain meaning "son of Owen" (Owen meaning 'noble') and the Irish Ó Buadhacháin meaning "descendant of Bohan" (Bohan meaning 'victorious'). The Bowen lineage can be traced back to Llwyngwair in the 11th century, near Nevern in Pembrokeshire. The Bowen surname was adopted in 1424. There are seven Bowen crests and the Bowen/Owen family group share a tartan. The Bowen/Bowens surnames are more commonly found in southern Wales, while the Owen/Owens surnames are more commonly found in northern Wales.

This is a list of notable people born with the last name Bowen and people who married into the Bowen family.

 Adam Bowen, American billionaire businessman, co-founder of Juul
 Sir Albert Bowen, 1st Baronet (1858–1924), British-Argentinian businessman
 Albert E. Bowen (1875–1953), American member of the Church of Jesus Christ of Latter-day Saints
 Alex Bowen (skier) (born 1991), American freestyle skier
 Alex Bowen (TV personality), British reality TV contestant
 Alex Bowen (water polo) (born 1993), American water polo player
 Andrea Bowen (born 1990), American actress and singer
 Andy Bowen (1867–1894), American boxer 
 Anthony Bowen (1809–1872) African-American civic leader
 Arthur "Waring" Bowen (1922–1980), solicitor who founded the charity British Rheumatism & Arthritis Association
 Arthur Bowen (actor) played Albus Potter in Harry Potter and the Deathly Hallows-Part 2
 Ashley Bowen (1728–1813), American sailor and writer
 Bart Bowen (born 1967), American cyclist
 Ben Bowen (2002–2005), American child who died from cancer
 Ben Bowen (musician) (born 1976), Canadian children's musician
 Benjamin John Bowen (1915–2009), Welsh rugby player
 Bill Bowen (1929–1999), African-American Ohio state senator
 Billy Bowen (1897–1960), Welsh rugby union and rugby league footballer of the 1920s
 Branden Bowen (born 1996), American football player
 Brian Bowen (born 1998), African-American college basketball player
 Bruce Bowen (born 1971), African-American basketball player
 Caroline Bowen (born 1944), Australian speech therapist
 Catherine Drinker Bowen (1897–1973), American author and historian
 Charles Bowen, Baron Bowen (1835–1894), English judge
 Charles Bowen (New Zealand politician) (1830–1917)
 Charles Bowen (Ontario politician) (1923–1992), mayor of Brantford
 Charles W. Bowen, Master Chief Petty Officer of the Coast Guard
 Chris Bowen (born 1973), Australian politician
 Christopher Bowen (born 1959), British actor
 Christopher C. Bowen (born 1973), South Carolina Congressman 
 Cliff Bowen (1875–1929), Welsh rugby player and cricketer
 Collin Bowen (1919–2011), Welsh archaeologist and landscape historian
 Curtis Bowen (born 1974), Canadian ice hockey player
 Daniel Bowen (born 1970), Australian blogger
 Dave Bowen (1928–1995), Welsh football (soccer) player
 Dave Bowen (Australian footballer) (1886–1946), Australian rules footballer
 David Bowen (cricketer) (born 1971), English cricketer
 David Bowen, Felinfoel (1774–1853), Welsh Baptist minister
 David Bowen (pathologist) (1924–2011), Welsh pathologist
 David Bowen (Wisconsin politician), member of the Wisconsin State Assembly
 David Glyn Bowen (1933–2000), Welsh Congregationalist minister and missionary
 David James Bowen (born 1925), Welsh scholar
 David John Bowen (1891–1912), Welsh boxer
 David R. Bowen (born 1932), Congressman for Mississippi
 Denis Bowen (1921–2006), South African artist, gallery director and promoter
 Dennis Bowen (1950–2012), American character actor
 Devin Bowen (born 1972), American tennis player
 Diamantina Bowen (c.1832/1833-1893), wife of British colonial administrator George Bowen
 Edmund Bowen (1898–1981), British chemist
 Edward Bowen (footballer, born 1858) (1858–1923), Druids F. C. and Wales international footballer
 Edward Bowen (politician) (1780–1866), Irish lawyer and politician in Lower Canada
 Edward Bowen (priest) (1828–1897), Anglican priest in Ireland
 Sir Edward Bowen, 2nd Baronet (1885–1937) of the Bowen Baronets
 Edward Ernest Bowen (1836–1901), Harrow schoolmaster
 Edward George Bowen (1911–1991), Welsh physicist
 Edward L. Bowen (born c. 1942), American author of books on Thoroughbred horse racing
 Elizabeth Bowen (1899–1973), Irish novelist
 Emanuel Bowen (1694–1767), Welsh engraver
 Emma L. Bowen, community activist in community health care and fair media
 Emma Lucy Gates Bowen (1882–1951), American opera singer
 Ezra A. Bowen, Wisconsin senator
 E. G. Bowen (1900–1983), Welsh geographer
 E. N. Bowen (1893–1959), American judge, lawyer and Illinois House of Representatives
 Francis Bowen (1811–1890), American philosophical writer and educationalist
 Francis Kipkoech Bowen (born 1973), Kenyan marathon runner
 Gail Bowen (born 1944), Canadian mystery writer, playwright and educator
 Geoffrey Bowen, Captain in the Battle of Wau
Sir George Bowen (1821–1899), British colonial administrator
George Bowen (colonial settler) (1803–1889), military officer and settler of New South Wales
George Bowen (footballer) (1875–1945), English soccer player
George Bowen (missionary) (1816–1888), American missionary in India
George Bowen (New York politician) (1831–1921), New York state senator
George Bowen (rugby player) (1863–1919), Welsh international rugby union half back
George Bevan Bowen (1858–1940), Welsh Conservative landowner and county officer in Pembrokeshire
Sir George Edward Michael Bowen, 6th Baronet (born 1987)
 Geraint Bowen (musician) (born 1963), musical director of the Hereford Three Choirs Festival
 Geraint Bowen (poet) (1915–2011), Welsh language poet and Archdruid of the Eisteddfod
 Harold G. Bowen Sr. (1883–1965), United States Navy admiral
 Harold L. Bowen (1886–1967), bishop of the Episcopal Diocese of Colorado
 Harry Bowen (rugby) (1864–1913), Welsh rugby player
 Harry Bowen (actor) (1888–1941), American character actor 
 Henry Bowen (1841–1915), Virginia lawyer, soldier and Congressman 
 Henry Chandler Bowen (1813–1896), American businessman 
 Herbert Wolcott Bowen (1856–1927), American poet and diplomat
 Hilda Bowen (1923-2002), Bahamian nurse
 Howard Bowen (1908–1989), American economist and college president
 Humphry Bowen (1929–2001), British botanist and chemist
 Ira Sprague Bowen (1898–1973), American astronomer
 James Bowen (artist) (died 1774), English painter and topographer
 James Bowen (jockey), Welsh jockey
 James Bowen (Royal Navy officer) (1751–1838)
 James Barton Bowen (1815–1881), mayor of Madison, Wisconsin
 James Bevan Bowen (MP) (1828–1905), British Member of Parliament for Pembrokeshire
 James Bevan Bowen (RAF officer) (1883–1969)
 James Bowen (railroad executive) (1808–1886), American who was president of Erie Railroad and Union Army general
 James Bowen (author) (born 1979), author of A Street Cat Named Bob
 James Bowen (footballer) (born 1996), English footballer
 James M. Bowen (1793–1880), first owner of "Mirador" residence in Greenwood, Virginia
 Jarrod Bowen (born 1996), English footballer 
 Jason Bowen (footballer) (born 1972), Welsh former footballer
 Jason Bowen (ice hockey) (born 1973), retired Canadian ice hockey player
 Jeff Bowen (born 1971), American composer, lyricist and actor
 Jeffrey Bowen, African-American songwriter and music producer
 Jehdeiah Bowen (1817–1891), American politician
 Jenny Bowen (filmmaker), American screenwriter, director, and founder of OneSky
 Jeremy Bowen (born 1960), British journalist and television presenter
 Jimmy Bowen (born 1937), American record producer and pop musician
 Joe Bowen (born 1951), the voice of the Toronto Maple Leafs
 Sir John Edward Mortimer Bowen, 3rd Baronet (1918–1939) of the Bowen baronets
 John Bowen (alderman) (1844–1926), English businessman
 John Bowen (antiquary) (1756–1832), English painter, genealogist and antiquarian
 John Bowen (bishop) (1815–1859), bishop of Sierra Leone
 John Bowen (British author) (1924–2019), British playwright and novelist
 John Bowen (Royal Navy officer) (1780–1827), English sailor and administrator; founded the first settlement at Hobart, Australia
 John Bowen (pirate) (died 1704), pirate active in the Indian Ocean and Red Sea
 John C. Bowen (1872–1957), Canadian clergyman
 John Clyde Bowen (1888–1978), American federal judge 
 John Eliot Bowen (1858–1890), American author
 John Gilbert Bowen (born 1947), British-born American porn director John T. Bone
 John Henry Bowen (1780–1822), American politician
 John J. Bowen Jr. (born 1955), American entrepreneur
 John S. Bowen (1830–1863), American Confederate Army general
 John S. Bowen (executive) (born c. 1927), American advertising executive
 John S. Bowen (sound designer), American synthesizer designer
 John Templeton Bowen (1857–1940), American dermatologist
 John W. Bowen (1926–2011), Republican politician in the Ohio Senate
 John W. E. Bowen Sr. (1855–1933), African-American Methodist clergyman and educator
 John William Bowen (1876–1965), Member of Parliament for Crewe, 1929–1931
 Jonathan Bowen (born 1956), British computer scientist
 José Antonio Bowen (born 1952), 11th president of Goucher College
 Joseph Bowen (born 1946), American prisoner
 Joseph R. Bowen (1950–2022), American politician
 Katie Bowen (born 1994), New Zealand association footballer
 Keith Bowen (born 1958), English footballer
 Kenneth Bowen (tenor) (1932–2018), Welsh tenor
 Lionel Bowen (born 1922), Australian politician
 Lorraine Bowen (born 1961), singer/songwriter and comedian
 Lynne Bowen (born 1940), Canadian historian, non-fiction writer, professor and journalist
 Mark Bowen (footballer) (born 1963), Welsh (soccer) footballer
 Mark Bowen (writer), American writer
 Mark Bowen (cricketer) (born 1967), English cricketer
 Sir Mark Edward Mortimer Bowen, 5th Baronet (1958–2014) of the Bowen baronets
 Mark Bowen, lead guitarist of British rock bank Idles
 Matt Bowen (born 1982), Australian rugby player
 Matt Bowen (American football) (born 1976), American football player
 Matt Bowen (musician), American musician
 Matty Bowen, English rugby league footballer
 Michael Bowen (actor) (born 1957), American film and television actor
 Michael Bowen (artist) (1937–2009), American artist
 Michael Bowen (bishop) (1930–2019), British Roman Catholic archbishop
 Murray Bowen (1913–1990), American psychiatrist
 Natasha Bowen Nigerian-Welsh writer and teacher
 Nicholas Bowen, educator
 Nigel Bowen (1911–1994), Australian lawyer, politician and judge
 Norman L. Bowen (1887–1956), Canadian geochemist and petrologist
 Otis Bowen (1918–2013), physician and 44th Governor of Indiana
 Patrick Gillman Bowen (1882–1940), Irish author and theosophist
 Rees Bowen (1809–1879), United States House of Representatives for Virginia
 Richard Bowen (Royal Navy) (1761–1797), Royal Navy officer
 Richard L. Bowen (born 1933), 7th president of Idaho State University
 Richard M. Bowen III, Citigroup whistleblower
 Richard Bowen (bowls) (born 1957), Welsh lawn bowler
 Rob Bowen (born 1981), baseball catcher
 Robert Bowen (politician) (born 1948), Colorado House of Representatives
 Robert O. Bowen (1920–2003), American novelist and essayist
 Robert Sidney Bowen (1900–1977), World War I aviator, journalist and author
 Robin E. Bowen, American college administrator
 Robin Huw Bowen (born 1957), Welsh harpist
 Roger Bowen (1932–1996), American actor
 Rufus Bowen (Robert Edward Bowen, 1947–1978), American mathematician
 Ryan Bowen (born 1975), basketball player
 Ryan Bowen (baseball) (born 1968), baseball player
 Sam Bowen (baseball) (born 1952), American baseball player
 Sam Bowen (boxer) (born 1992), British boxer
 Sam Bowen (footballer) (born 2001), Welsh footballer
 Samuel Edward Bowen (1903–1981), English footballer
 Sandra Bowen (born 1941), American civil servant
  Sandra Bowen (born 1976), Australian volleyball player
 Shepard P. Bowen (1824–1908), New York politician
 Stephen Bowen (American football) (born 1984), African-American football player
 Stephen Bowen (astronaut) (born 1964), American astronaut
 Stephen Bowen (biologist), American fish biologist and former educator of Oxford College of Emory University
 Stephen Bowen (politician) (born 1969), Maine House of Representatives
 Sir Thomas Frederic Charles Bowen, 4th Baronet (1921–1989) of the Bowen baronets
 Thomas Ambrose Bowen (1916–1982), inventor of the Bowen technique
 Thomas H. Bowen (1850–1896), South Australian surveyor
 Thomas M. Bowen (1835–1906), U.S. Senator
 Thomas Bowen (engraver) (died 1790), map engraver
 Thomas Bowen (Wisconsin politician) (1808–1883), Wisconsin state senator
 Thomas Bowen (Independent minister) (1756–1827), Welsh Independent minister
 Thomas Jefferson Bowen (1814–1875), American expatriate Baptist missionary
 Tom Bowen (athletic director) (born 1961), American sports executive
 Tommy Bowen, member of the English band White Lies
 Tommy Bowen (footballer) (1900–1954), English footballer
 Trevor Bowen (born 1941), English actor and screenwriter
 Trevor Bowen (rugby), British rugby union and rugby league footballer
 Tristan Bowen (born 1991), African-American soccer player
 Vanessa Bowen (born 1974), Sri Lankan cricketer
 William Bowen (actor) (1666–1718), British stage actor
 William Bowen (rugby player) (1862–1925), Welsh rugby union footballer
 William Bowen (author) (1877–1937), children's author and Newbery Honor recipient
 William Bowen (British Army officer) (1898–1961), British Army general
 William G. Bowen (1933–2016), 17th president of Princeton University
 William Miller Bowen (1862–1937), civic leader in Los Angeles, California
 York Bowen (1884–1961), English composer

See also
 Ab Owen
 Ab Owain
 Bowens (surname)
 Bown
 Bowne
 Owen (name), given name and surname
 Owens (surname)

References

External links
 Surname map of Bowen The Fitzpatrick - Mac Giolla Phádraig Clan Society

Welsh-language surnames
Anglicised Welsh-language surnames
Patronymic surnames
Surnames from given names